The twenty−ninth series of the British medical drama television series Casualty commenced airing in the United Kingdom on 30 August 2014, and concluded on 23 August 2015. The series consisted of 46 episodes. Erika Hossington continued her role as series producer, while Oliver Kent continued his role as the show's executive producer. Fifteen cast members reprised their roles from the previous series with three long-serving cast members departing during this series. Jane Hazlegrove reprised her role as paramedic Kathleen "Dixie" Dixon in the premiere episode, following a three month absence. Sunetra Sarker, William Beck and Michael Stevenson reprised their roles as ED consultants Zoe Hanna and Dylan Keogh, and paramedic Iain Dean in October 2014. Charles Venn joined the show's main cast in summer 2015 as senior staff nurse Jacob Masters.

This series featured three webisodes. The first two webisodes were a two-parter focusing on main character Noel Garcia pursuing his dream career of being a radio DJ, while the final webisode of the series focused on main characters Zoe Hanna and Max Walker's respective pre-wedding celebrations. On 2 July 2014, it was announced that Casualty would be airing three standalone episodes. The standalone episodes were noted as being "independent from the main series story arc", as well as making "no reference to ongoing plotlines". An inside source told Casualty the cast and crew called the episodes "Holby Noir". The first episode aired on 15 November 2014, a week later than originally planned, while the second episode aired on 28 March 2015, with the final episode airing on 11 July 2015. In August 2014, series producer Erika Hossington revealed that she had made updates to the style of the show, by looking at, and changing, the cameras the show were shooting on, the format the show was shooting in, and also the lightbulbs used in the studio.

During series twenty-nine, Casualty was awarded the Best Soap and Continuing Drama accolade at the 2015 Royal Television Society awards ceremony. The show also won the Best Drama award at the 2015 Inside Soap Awards. Throughout the series, the show was also shortlisted under the Best Family Drama award at the 2015 TV Choice Awards, however it was beaten by Call the Midwife. In addition to this, the Casualty production team were shortlisted under the Best Television Soap and Continuing Drama category at the 2015 BAFTA awards. Actor Lee Mead was nominated under the category Newcomer for his portrayal of his character Lofty Chiltern at the National Television Awards 2015, however did not win the award.

Production 
Oliver Kent continued his role as executive producer, while Erika Hossington remained as series producer. This series consisted of 46 episodes. In addition to this, this series featured three webisodes. The first two webisodes, "Radio Holby", were a two-part story that aired on 18 October and 25 October 2014, following the broadcast of episodes seven and eight respectively. The story featured receptionist Noel Garcia (Marshall) deciding to pursue his dream of being a radio DJ while "hoping to boost the atmosphere of the ED" as he takes over the hospital's radio station. The webisodes were created by the show's junior editorial team with Ross Southard leading the idea. Hossington praised the behind-the-scenes team and expressed her delight at the webisodes being commissioned, saying, "Everyone who worked on the webisodes stepped up a level, and with their passion, enthusiasm and dedication totally focused on making the best finished project. The end result is a real treat for our website visitors and fans." The final webisode, "Mrs Walker-To-Be", centered around the characters of Zoe Hanna (Sarker) and Max Walker (Davis) as they went on their respective pre-wedding celebrations and was published online on 22 August 2015, following the broadcast of episode forty-five.

On 2 July 2014, Radio Times revealed plans for the show to air three standalone episodes. The standalone episodes were noted as being "independent from the main series story arc", as well as making "no reference to ongoing plotlines". It was reported that an inside source from the show branded the standalone episodes as "really stylish", as well as calling the episodes "Casualty Noir". More information about the standalone episodes were revealed in August 2014, during an interview with series producer Erika Hossington, who said that the episodes were devised to "give the audience a treat of a different kind". In addition to this, the episodes were created by former show scriptwriters, in an attempt to "tempt back some of Casualty writing alumni who had gone onto bigger and better things". The first standalone episode was supposed to be broadcast on 1 November 2014, however the episode was later moved to 15 November 2014, for unknown reasons. The episode, entitled "Deadfall", was written by Jeff Povey and directed by David Innes Edwards, and featured main character Lily Chao (Yu) solving a murder mystery. The second episode was broadcast on 28 March 2015, entitled "The Road Not Taken". It was written by Barbara Machin and directed by Ian Barnes. This episode featured main character Zoe Hanna (Sarker) wondering how different life could be if she made one difference to her day. The final standalone episode, entitled "Holby Sin City", aired on 11 July 2015, and was written by Mark Catley and directed by Simon Massey. The episode featured main character Ethan Hardy (Rainsford) solving a mysterious murder case. 

In August 2014, Hossington revealed in an interview with Digital Spy that her main aims for Casualty since taking over were to focus the show on "the characters who the audience really loved" and to see more "interest and compelling" guest stories. As well as moving the show's focus back to character-based storylines and reintroducing compelling guest stories, Hossington also revealed that there were "certain aspects" of the show which she felt were "out of date in terms of what the show looked like". Hossington told Digital Spy that she looked at everything: from the cameras the show were shooting on, to the format the show was shooting in, as well as changing the light bulbs in the studio.

Cast 
The twenty-ninth series of Casualty featured a cast of characters working in the emergency department of Holby City Hospital. The majority of the cast from the previous series continued to appear in this series. Amanda Mealing appeared as the clinical lead and a consultant in emergency medicine Connie Beauchamp, whilst Patrick Robinson appeared as consultant Martin "Ash" Ashford. George Rainsford and Richard Winsor portrayed specialist registrars Ethan Hardy and Caleb "Cal" Knight. Crystal Yu starred as a doctor undergoing the first, and later second, year of core training Lily Chao. Derek Thompson continued his role of senior charge nurse and emergency nurse practitioner Charlie Fairhead, whilst Suzanne Packer appeared as clinical nurse manager and ward sister, later just ward sister Tess Bateman. Chloe Howman portrayed staff nurse and later, senior staff nurse and clinical nurse manager/ward sister Rita Freeman, whilst Amanda Henderson and Lee Mead starred as staff nurses Robyn Miller and Ben "Lofty" Chiltern. Charles Dale portrayed emergency care assistant, and later healthcare assistant, Mackenzie "Big Mac" Chalker. Jamie Davis continued his role of porter Max Walker, whilst Tony Marshall and Azuka Oforka appeared as receptionists Noel Garcia and Louise Tyler. Matt Bardock and Gemma Atkinson starred as paramedics Jeff Collier and Tamzin Bayle, with the latter appearing in a recurring capacity.

Chelsee Healey's casting in the role of barista Honey Wright was announced on 19 May 2014. She was billed as having "big hair and a big personality". She made her first appearance in episode six, broadcast on 11 October. Healey signed a four-month contract and departed at its conclusion in episode twenty-one, broadcast on 14 February 2015. Healey returned to filming in spring 2015 and Honey returned in episode forty-one, broadcast on 25 July 2016. A trailer previewing "dramatic Winter episodes" was released on 4 October 2014 including the introduction of Connie's daughter Grace Beauchamp. Emily Carey's agency revealed that she had been cast in the role of Grace. Grace made her first appearance during episode twelve, broadcast on 29 November 2014. Frances Tomelty and Sarah Jayne Dunn were announced to be joining the show in August 2014 by series producer Erika Hossington. Tomelty's agent and Dunn's official website revealed they had been cast as Audrey and Taylor respectively. Audrey is introduced as the grandmother of Grace, whilst Taylor is a love interest for Cal Knight. Both characters made their first appearance in episode thirteen, broadcast on 6 December 2014. Carey and Tomelty departed from the series in episode eighteen, broadcast on 24 January 2015, whilst Dunn departed in episode twenty-nine, broadcast on 18 April 2015, at the conclusion of the storyline which saw her revealed to be conning Cal. Charles Venn was announced to be joining the cast as nurse Jacob Masters. Venn described his casting as "a pleasure and honour" and Kent said he was "thrilled" to welcome Venn. Venn's debut episode - the fortieth episode of the series - was broadcast on 18 July 2015, a week later than originally planned.

Bardock announced his decision to leave his role of Jeff Collier on 30 June 2014, following seven years on the show. Following Bardock's choice to leave the serial, Atkinson announced she would also depart with Tamzin leaving at the conclusion of her storyline. Bardock's final scenes aired in episode five, broadcast on 4 October 2014, when Jeff was killed in a car explosion as part of a "shock twist". Atkinson made her final appearance in the following episode, broadcast on 11 October 2014, when Tamzin opted to resign following Jeff's death. Robinson's departure from the serial was announced in episode fifteen, broadcast on 3 January 2015, following the show's return from the Christmas break, although it was not screened. Packer's decision to quit her role was revealed in April 2015, although it was not confirmed by BBC. Luke Bailey reprised his role as Tess' son, Sam Bateman, for one episode to aid Tess' departure storyline. They departed in episode forty-four, broadcast on 15 August 2015, but Tess made a cameo appearance in the following episode.

Jane Hazlegrove and Sunetra Sarker temporarily departed from their respective roles of paramedic Kathleen "Dixie" Dixon and consultant Zoe Hanna in the previous series. Hazlegrove returned in episode one, broadcast on 30 August 2014, and Sarker returned in episode eight, broadcast on 25 October 2014. Hossington previously teased the return of a "top secret" character, who returned alongside Sarker. The character was revealed as Dylan Keogh (William Beck) during the episode's broadcast, who was last seen in 2012. Episode six, broadcast on 11 October 2014, saw the return of Jamie Collier (Daniel Anthony) and Iain Dean (Michael Stevenson) who both appeared for Jeff's funeral. Stevenson, who previously appeared on the show for six months in 2013, subsequently joined the show's main cast. Hossington explained that Iain and Dixie would begin a partnership which would be "fun" to create. Mark Letheren made four guest appearances throughout the series as counsellor Ben Harding, a role he has played on-off since 2007. Susan Cookson reprised her role as Maggie Coldwell in episode twenty-six for a non-canon storyline which saw Maggie invite Zoe to join the Air Ambulance service. Gregory Forsyth-Foreman returned to the show as Louis Fairhead in episode thirty-two for a storyline which saw Louis become addicted to drugs.

Hossington confirmed in an interview with Digital Spy that Holby City characters, Guy Self (John Michie) and Elliot Hope (Paul Bradley), would appear in the series. Despite stating Guy would "pop up quite a lot", he only appeared in episode seven. Elliot made a cameo appearance in episode one. Following their returns to Holby City in October 2014 and April 2015 respectively, Michael Spence (Hari Dhillon) and Henrik Hanssen (Guy Henry) featured in one episode of Casualty each. Zach Manley (Aleksy Komorowski) was introduced in episode thirty-one as a love interest for Robyn. He departed in episode thirty-eight at the conclusion of the storyline. Greta Miller (Kazia Pelka), the mother of Max, was introduced in episode forty-one. She departed in episode forty-six, having appeared in the Red Button special, "Mrs Walker-To-Be". Matthew Marsh guest appeared in episode forty-three as Brian Carroll, Dylan's father, alongside Vicky Hall who appeared as Brian's partner Hazel Leyton.

Main characters 

Matt Bardock as Jeff Collier
William Beck as Dylan Keogh
Charles Dale as Big Mac
Jamie Davis as Max Walker
Jane Hazlegrove as Kathleen "Dixie" Dixon
Amanda Henderson as Robyn Miller
Chloe Howman as Rita Freeman
Tony Marshall as Noel Garcia
Lee Mead as Ben "Lofty" Chiltern
Amanda Mealing as Connie Beauchamp
Azuka Oforka as Louise Tyler
Suzanne Packer as Tess Bateman
George Rainsford as Ethan Hardy
Patrick Robinson as Martin "Ash" Ashford
Sunetra Sarker as Zoe Hanna
Michael Stevenson as Iain Dean
Derek Thompson as Charlie Fairhead
Charles Venn as Jacob Masters
Richard Winsor as Caleb Knight
Crystal Yu as Lily Chao

Recurring characters 

Gemma Atkinson as Tamzin Bayle
Emily Carey as Grace Beauchamp
Sarah Jayne Dunn as Taylor Ashbie
Gregory Forsyth-Foreman as Louis Fairhead
Chelsee Healey as Honey Wright
Frances Tomelty as Audrey Strachan

Guest characters 

Daniel Anthony as Jamie Collier
Luke Bailey as Sam Bateman
Paul Bradley as Elliot Hope
Michelle Collins as Samantha Kellman
Susan Cookson as Maggie Coldwell
Hari Dhillon as Michael Spence
Vicky Hall as Hazel Leyton
Guy Henry as Henrik Hanssen
Aleksy Komorowski as Zach Manley
Mark Letheren as Ben Harding
Matthew Marsh as Brian Carroll
John Michie as Guy Self
Kazia Pelka as Greta Miller

Episodes

Reception 
The show was awarded the Best Soap and Continuing Drama accolade at the 2015 Royal Television Society award ceremony, beating competitors Coronation Street and EastEnders. Speaking of the win, the Royal Television Society wrote, "[Casualty is] a show that had regained exceptional form. A strong sense of the community within the show never detracted from the individual journeys the characters went on...an excellent drama." In May 2015, it was announced the show had been longlisted for the Best Family Drama award at the 2015 TV Choice Awards. The show made the shortlist but lost out to Call the Midwife. The show won the Best Drama award at the 2015 Inside Soap Awards, beating competitors Holby City and Waterloo Road. The Casualty production team were shortlisted at the BAFTA 2015 awards under the category of Best Television Soap and Continuing Drama, however the show was unsuccessful, with Coronation Street winning instead. Lee Mead was nominated under the category Newcomer for his portrayal of Ben "Lofty" Chiltern at the National Television Awards 2015, however Mead lost out on the award.

Daniel Kilkelly of Digital Spy described the surprise of Jeff's death as a "success". Following the broadcast of the first standalone episode on 15 November 2014, Duncan Lindsay of Metro expressed his opinions on the episode, saying that "the storyline itself wasn't bad at all", however the episode was "let down by the choice of characters involved". Lindsay felt that the lead character of the episode, Lily Chao, was "not a likeable enough character" to lead the murder mystery storyline. Lindsay then went on to say that he felt the episode would have been better if it had focused on the "more personable character" in the show. 

Show scriptwriter Mark Catley, who wrote the third standalone episode "Holby Sin City", received negative criticism about the episode from fans, expressing their displeasure at the episode. Daniel Kilkelly of Digital Spy labelled "Holby Sin City" as "one of the show's most divisive episodes ever." The show faced further criticism following the broadcast of episode forty-three, which featured a patient crash his lorry after blacking out while driving. The character was diagnosed with narcolepsy, but refused to tell the DVLA about his diagnosis. The storyline was compared to the real-life 2014 Glasgow bin lorry crash, with four similarities made between the fictional crash and the real-life crash, and described as "deeply unfortunate". A BBC spokesperson said, "We would never knowingly imitate a real life event. Parallels can be drawn with many of our storylines. However, with the amount of stories that we tell of characters in extreme situations, it is hard to avoid dramatising situations that can occasionally be reminiscent of real life events".

Casualty two-parter finale episodes were described by the Daily Mirror as potentially being "the most dramatic episodes in three decades". After the airing of episode forty-six, Irish Examiner said that fans had been "left reeling" and were "on the edge" following the show's dramatic cliffhanger. Digital Spy stated fans "could not cope" with the episode and had been left with "a lot of feelings following the dramatic cliffhanger".

References

External links
 Casualty at BBC Online
 Casualty series 29 at BBC Online
 Casualty series 29 at the Internet Movie Database

29
2014 British television seasons
2015 British television seasons